The 2017 AIHL season was the 18th season of the Australian Ice Hockey League (AIHL). It ran from 22 April 2017 until 27 August 2017, with the Goodall Cup finals following on 2 and 3 September. The Melbourne Ice won both the H Newman Reid Trophy for finishing first in the regular season, and the Goodall Cup after defeating the CBR Brave in the final.

Teams
In 2017 the AIHL had 8 teams competing in the league.

League business
In December 2016 the Adelaide Adrenaline revealed their new logo designs. The new primary logo features two peaks in the shape of the letter "A". The club also introduced a secondary logo featuring a piping shrike. In January 2017 the Melbourne Mustangs announced that the James Hotel would be their naming rights sponsor for the 2017 season, replacing MOAT: Mental Health Services which had held it since 2014. The James Hotel will also continue as the clubs pre- and post-game and function venue. The Mustangs also added Quest Docklands as a major sponsor in May. On 17 January 2017 the league announced that the Sydney Bears and Sydney Ice Dogs would relocate to the Macquarie Ice Rink. The Bears move from the Penrith Ice Palace where they have played since 2015 and the Ice Dogs move from the Liverpool Catholic Club Ice Rink. In March 2017 the Ice Dogs revealed their new jersey designs which saw the club remove their logo in favour of the words "ICE DOGS" written out diagonally across the front. In addition to the changes from the Adrenaline and Ice Dogs the CBR Brave, Melbourne Ice, Melbourne Mustangs, Newcastle Northstars and Sydney Bears also released new jersey designs. In March and April the Perth Thunder signed Richard's Tyrepower, MacTrack, MyLeadPod and Bendigo Bank as new sponsors for the 2017 season. The Thunder also announced that CD Dodd had increased their level of sponsorship for 2017, becoming the clubs naming rights sponsor. In April the Brave announced that the Tuggeranong Hyperdome had signed on as a major sponsor and Anytime Fitness had increased their sponsorship to be a major sponsor of the club. The following month the Brave announced that ONTHEGO had signed on as their official apparel partner. In April 2017 Newcastle changed their name from the Newcastle North Stars to the Newcastle Northstars. The re-brand was done to align the club with the New South Wales registered club, the Newcastle Northstars Ice Hockey Club. At the end of April the Adrenaline announced that radio station 1079 Life had signed on as their official media partner with the deal including at least one game being live broadcast and regular interviews. Also at the end of April both the Bears and Ice Dogs announced their official venue sponsors. The Bears signed The Ranch Hotel as their home venue sponsor while the Ice Dogs signed with T.G.I. Friday's Macquarie Centre restaurant. In May the Ice Dogs announced that they would be radio streaming the remainder of their home games via Mixlr. Also in May the Ice Dogs released a new logo as part of their 15th anniversary celebrations. The new logo featured a redesigned bulldog holding a broken ice hockey stick. In June the Brave signed The Woden Tradies & Quality Hotel as their official post-game venue for the remainder of the season. In June the Melbourne Ice announced that 'Life. Be in It' had signed on as their naming rights sponsor and Kidney Health Australia as their charity partner and volunteer sponsor. In August the Ice Dogs announced the signing of Crankt Protein as a new sponsor for the club.

Exhibition games
In February 2015 the Melbourne Ice and Melbourne Mustangs announced that they would host the New Zealand men's national ice hockey team in a four-game exhibition series at the O'Brien Group Arena, competing in two games each. The series was held as part of a warm up for New Zealand ahead of the 2017 IIHF Ice Hockey World Championship Division II Group B tournament. The Mustangs won both of their games 5–4 with the first being won in a shootout. The Ice defeated New Zealand 3–1 in the first game, however lost their second 0–9. The 2017 edition of the Wilson Cup was not held due to a high workload in relation to the move of the Bears to the Macquarie Ice Rink. It is the first time since 2013 that the tournament has not been held. The Wilson Cup was later re-purposed to be awarded to the winner of the regular season series between the Bears and Ice Dogs. The Bears retained the Cup after the series was tied both on wins and goal difference. On 13 April the Melbourne Ice and Melbourne Mustangs competed in an exhibition match at the O'Brien Group Arena with the Ice winning 8–1. On 15 April the Adelaide Adrenaline held an exhibition match against an Ice Hockey South Australia All Star team as part of the Hockey Day in Adelaide event at the Adelaide Ice Arena. The Adrenaline won the match 9–1. On 22 June the Melbourne Ice and Melbourne Mustangs joined the Ice Hockey Classic series for an exhibition game at the O'Brien Group Arena. The Ice joined Team Canada and the Mustangs joined Team USA for the 4 on 4 match. Team USA and the Mustangs defeated Team Canada and the Ice 8–5. On 22 July the Perth Thunder played an exhibition game at Cockburn Ice Arena against a team of Western Australian All-Stars to help raise funds for junior ice hockey. The Thunder won the match 9–1. On 7 September 2017 the Mustangs held their players v sponsors match at the O'Brien Group Arena with the game finishing in an eight all draw.

Personnel changes
In October 2016 it was announced that the Adelaide Adrenaline had signed Sami Mantere to the position of head coach, replacing interim head coach Eric Lien who had been in the role since June. The following month Perth Thunder head coach Dave Kenway stepped down from his position due to family and work commitments. Following his resignation Kenway took on the role of Director of Hockey at the club. Kenway was replaced in the position of head coach by former player Dave Ruck. In January 2017 the CBR Brave announced the signing of former Northstars' player Rob Starke as head coach. Starke comes into the position which was left empty after the departure of Josh Unice in August 2016. In March 2017 it was announced that the Ice Dogs had signed former Australian national team player Christopher Blagg to the position of head coach. The signing follows the resignation of Vladimir Rubes along with his assistant Christopher Sekura who both stepped down due to family commitments. The club also announced the signing of Christopher Foster and Andrew Waite as assistant coaches.

Player transfers

Interclub transfers

* Mid-season transfer.

Retirements

New signings

Players lost

Regular season
The regular season began on 22 April 2017 and will run through to 27 August 2017 before the top four teams advance to compete in the Goodall Cup playoff series. On 7 May the game between the Melbourne Ice and Sydney Bears had to be cancelled after the first period due to a fire in the Macquarie Ice Rink's speaker system. It was later rescheduled to 16 July at the Macquarie Ice Rink. Due to the 2017 Ice Hockey Classic which was held on 17 June in Sydney and 24 June in Melbourne the league made two changes to the June fixture. The match between the Sydney Ice Dogs and Newcastle North Stars was moved from 17 to 16 June. The other match moved was between the Melbourne Ice and Melbourne Mustangs which was changed from 24 to 25 June.

10 June game between the CBR Brave and Adelaide Adrenaline served as the third annual beyondblue Cup, setup held to raise awareness for the charity. The Brave won the Cup for the third year in a row, defeating the Adrenaline 8–3. 1 July match between the Melbourne Ice and Sydney Bears served as the fourth annual Canada Day Classic. The Ice won the match 6–4, claiming the title for the first time. The 2017 Matt Clark Shield match was also held on 1 July and was contested between the Sydney Ice Dogs and Perth Thunder. The Ice Dogs won the match 5–3 to claim their second Matt Clark Shield having defeated the Adrenaline last year. 8 July match between the Perth Thunder and CBR Brave served the Thunder's charity match. The match, known as "Pink on the Rink", was held as a fundraiser for the McGrath Foundation and saw the Thunder wearing an all-pinked jersey. Round 13, which ran on 22 and 23 July, was the league's pride round. The round was held to raise awareness for the LGBTIQ community and saw the Mustangs wear a pride themed rainbow jersey. On 30 July the Melbourne Ice held a Swedish themed day. As part of the day the club wore a blue and gold coloured variant of their jersey in the match against the Sydney Ice Dogs. During Round 15, which ran on 4 and 5 August, the Adelaide Adrenaline held a heritage round. The round saw the Adrenaline wearing an Adelaide Avalanche themed jersey in their two games against the Perth Thunder.

The Melbourne Ice won the H Newman Reid Trophy after finishing first in the regular season with 71 points. The Adelaide Adrenaline's Cameron Critchlow won the Most Valuable Player and Rob Haselhurst of the Perth Thunder was named Defenceman of the Year. The CBR Brave's Bayley Kubara was named Rookie of the Year, Damien Ketlo of the Sydney Ice Dogs won the Goaltender of the Year and the Melbourne Ice's Joey Hughes was named the Skaters Network Local Player of the Year. Perth Thunder's Dave Ruck was named Coach of the Year.

April

May

June

July

August

Standings

Source

Statistics

Scoring leaders
List shows the ten top skaters sorted by points, then goals. Updated 27 August 2017.

Leading goaltenders
Only the top five goaltenders, based on save percentage with a minimum 40% of the team's ice time. Updated 27 August 2017.

Season awards

Below lists the 2017 AIHL regular season award winners.

Source

Goodall Cup playoffs
The 2017 playoffs started on 2 September with the Goodall Cup final held on 3 September. Following the end of the regular season the top four teams advanced to the playoff series. All three games were held at the O'Brien Group Arena in Docklands, Victoria, the home of the Melbourne Ice and Melbourne Mustangs. The series was a single game elimination with the two winning semi-finalists advancing to the Goodall Cup final. The finals were sponsored by Air Canada, the fifth year in a row. The Goodall Cup was won by the Melbourne Ice who defeated the CBR Brave 4–1. The Ice's Sebastian Ottosson was named the finals most valuable player.

All times are UTC+10:00

Semi-finals

Final

All-Star weekend
The 2017 AIHL All-Star Weekend was held at the O'Brien Group Arena, Melbourne on 3 and 4 June 2017. The format of the weekend remained unchanged from 2016 with a skills competition on 3 June and an all-stars game on 4 June. Melbourne Mustangs' Jamie Bourke and Lliam Webster of the Melbourne Ice were announced as the captains of the two teams replacing Michael Schlamp and Matt Armstrong from 2016. APA Group re-signed as sponsor of the weekend after sponsoring the previous two events. The weekend is also included on the Fox Sports broadcast schedule.

The Skills competition saw Melbourne Mustangs players take out three of the seven events, the Melbourne Ice took two, and the Adelaide Adrenaline and Sydney Ice Dogs both picked up one each. On 4 June Team Webster defeated Team Bourke 14–7 at the O'Brien Group Arena to win the 2017 All-Star Game. Dominic Jalbert of the CBR Brave was named the most valuable player of the match.

Skills competition
Breakaway Challenge: Joseph Hughes (Melbourne Ice)
Elimination Shootout: Josef Rezek (Adelaide Adrenaline)
Fastest Skater: Patrick O’Kane (Melbourne Mustangs) – 11 seconds
Goaltender Race: Damien Ketlo (Sydney Ice Dogs)
Hardest Shot: Matt Beattie (Melbourne Mustangs) – 146 km/h
Shooting Accuracy: Jamie Bourke (Melbourne Mustangs) – 9.3 seconds
Stickhandling: Joseph Hughes (Melbourne Ice)

All-star game

References

External links
The Australian Ice Hockey League

2017 in ice hockey
2017 in Australian sport
2017